Ordizia, formerly known as Villafranca de Ordizia, is a town and municipality located in the Goierri region of the province of Gipuzkoa, in the autonomous community of the Basque Country, northern Spain.

The professional cycle road race Prueba Villafranca de Ordizia is held yearly in Ordizia.

References

External links
 Official website 
 Ordiziako Ahotsa  
 ORDIZIA in the Bernardo Estornés Lasa - Auñamendi Encyclopedia (Euskomedia Fundazioa) 
 EAJ-PNV Ordizia 

Municipalities in Gipuzkoa